The 2003–04 season was Juventus Football Club's 106th in existence and 102nd consecutive season in the top flight of Italian football.

Players

Squad information

Transfers

Left club during season

Competitions

Supercoppa Italiana

Serie A

League table

Results summary

Results by round

Matches

Coppa Italia

Round of 16

Quarter-finals

Semi-finals

Final

UEFA Champions League

Group stage

Knockout phase

Round of 16

Statistics

Players statistics

Goalscorers

  David Trezeguet 16
  Marco Di Vaio 11
  Fabrizio Miccoli 8
  Alessandro Del Piero 8
  Pavel Nedvěd 6

References

Juventus F.C. seasons
Juventus